Finland have qualified once for a UEFA European Championship, the 2020 edition. They directly qualified after securing the second spot in their qualifying group, with one group match remaining; this meant they would appear in a major tournament finals for the first time in their history. Despite winning their opening game against Denmark, they exited in the group stage after losing their next two matches.

Euro 2020

Group stage

The group stage draw took place on 30 November 2019.

Ranking of third-placed teams

Overall record

References

 
Countries at the UEFA European Championship